Etchingham railway station is on the Hastings line in the south of England and serves the village of Etchingham, East Sussex. It is  down the line from London Charing Cross. The station and all trains serving it are operated by Southeastern.

History

Etchingham station has two platforms linked by a footbridge (with steps on both sides) and a station building housing the ticket office and waiting room. The building dates from 1851, when both the station and the first section of the Hastings line opened, and incorporates sandstone blocks taken from a manor house which stood on the site.

Facilities 
Train information is provided in the form of automated announcements, LED displays and timetable posters. Disabled passengers may cross between the platforms using the level crossing to the south of the station.

Etchingham is in a penalty fare area and when the ticket office is closed passengers should purchase a ticket before boarding a train.

Services 
All services at Etchingham are operated by Southeastern using  EMUs.

The typical off-peak service in trains per hour is:
 1 tph to London Charing Cross via 
 1 tph to 

During the peak hours, the station is served by additional services between London Charing Cross and Hastings, increasing the service to 2 tph in each direction.

References

External links 

Railway stations in East Sussex
DfT Category E stations
Former South Eastern Railway (UK) stations
Railway stations in Great Britain opened in 1851
Railway stations served by Southeastern
1851 establishments in England
railway station